Sprouty-related, EVH1 domain-containing protein 3 also known as Spread-3 is a protein that in humans is encoded by the SPRED3 gene.

Spread-3 is a member of the Sprouty (see SPRY1/SPRED) family of proteins that regulate growth factor-induced activation of the MAP kinase cascade.

References

Further reading 

 
 
 
 

EVH1 domain
SPR domain